John Sibley Whalen (June 30, 1868 – May 3, 1913) was Secretary of State of New York from 1907 to 1908.

Biography
Whalen was a son of Richard Whalen of Rochester, one of the oldest tobacconists in the United States. He graduated from St. Patrick's Parochial School, Rochester High School, and Rochester Business Institute. He then engaged in the cigar and tobacco business in Norwich and Oneonta, New York, later returning to Rochester to work for his father's company.  He was a member of the Tobacco Workers' Union and President of the Rochester Trade and Labor Council. His high standing in labor circles resulted in his selection by Governor John Alden Dix as First Deputy State Labor Commissioner, and he was nominated for New York Secretary of State by the Independence League, and endorsed by the Democratic Party, and elected in November 1906. In 1908, he was defeated for re-election. He served as deputy commissioner of labor for New York, from 1911 until his death. Whalen died at his home in Rochester, New York, on May 3, 1913.

References

1868 births
1913 deaths
Secretaries of State of New York (state)
Politicians from Rochester, New York
United States Independence Party politicians